HMCS Gaspé was a  that served in the Royal Canadian Navy from 1938 to 1945. She saw service during the Second World War as part of the local defence of Halifax, Nova Scotia. She was named for  Gaspé Bay in Quebec. Following the war the ship was sold for mercantile use, becoming the tugboat Sung Li. The ship's registry was deleted in 1993.

Design and description 
In 1936, new minesweepers were ordered for the Royal Canadian Navy. Based on the British , those built on the east coast would cost $318,000 per vessel. At the outbreak of the Second World War, the Royal Canadian Navy considered constructing more, but chose to build s instead upon learning of that design due to their oil-burning engines.

The Fundy class, named after the lead ship, displaced . They had a complement of 3 officers and 35 ratings.

The Fundy class was propelled by one shaft driven by vertical triple expansion engine powered by steam from a one-cylinder boiler.

The ships were armed with one QF  Mk IV gun mounted forward on a raised platform. The minesweepers were armed with two 20 mm Oerlikon anti-aircraft cannon. They were later equipped with 25 depth charges.

Service history

Gaspé was ordered on 23 August 1937 for the Royal Canadian Navy. The vessel's keel was laid down on 24 January 1938 by Morton Engineering and Dry Dock Co. at Quebec City. The ship was launched on 12 August later that year. Gaspé was commissioned into the Royal Canadian Navy on 21 October 1938 at Quebec City.

After commissioning, Gaspé was one of two of the Fundy-class minesweepers assigned to the east coast of Canada. She was stationed at Halifax, Nova Scotia when the war broke out. At the onset of war, Gaspé and sister ship  were the only warships available to patrol the entrance to Halifax's harbour. She served with the Halifax Local Defence Force as a local minesweeper. The ship was paid off on 23 July 1945 at Halifax.

Gaspé was sold into mercantile service in 1946. The ship re-emerged as the tugboat Sung Li, working out of Shanghai. The ship's registry was deleted in 1993.

References

Notes

Citations

Sources

 
 
 
 
 
 
 

Fundy-class minesweepers
Ships built in Quebec
1938 ships
World War II minesweepers of Canada